Seyyed Mohammad-Ali Afshani (born 1960 in Dehdasht, Kohgiluyeh and Boyer-Ahmad Province) is an Iranian politician who was the mayor of Tehran from May to November 2018. Afshani was elected Mayor by the Islamic City Council of Tehran on 13 May 2018, with 19 out of 21 votes in favor, succeeding the interim mayor Samiollah Hosseini Makarem on 16 May. He was previously the governor of Fars Province from 17 July 2015 to 13 September 2017.

References

1960 births
Living people
Mayors of Tehran
National Trust Party (Iran) politicians
People from Kohgiluyeh and Boyer-Ahmad Province
Iranian governors